Sonja Smits (born September 8, 1958) is a Canadian actress. She was nominated for two Genie Awards: for Videodrome (1983) and That's My Baby! (1984). On television, she starred in Street Legal (1987-1992) and Traders (1996-2000).

Life and career
Smits was born in Ottawa Valley, Ontario, Canada. She went to Bell High School in Bells Corners, she also attended Woodroffe High School and South Carleton High School in Richmond, a village outside Ottawa. She studied acting at Ryerson Polytechnic Institute until she was invited to join the Centre Stage theatre company in London, Ontario.

Smits has played roles in many television series, including Falcon Crest, Airwolf, Odyssey 5, The Outer Limits, Street Legal, Traders, The Best Laid Plans and The Eleventh Hour. Smits also played Bianca O'Blivion in the David Cronenberg horror movie Videodrome (1983) and was lead actress in 2021 drama film Drifting Snow.

Smits is married to Atlantis Films co-founder Seaton McLean with whom she has two children. They live in the Rosedale neighbourhood of Toronto and are the owners of the Closson Chase winery in Prince Edward County.  They also own a farm close to the winery.

In 2009, Smits was elected president of the board of directors of the Harbourfront Centre.

Smits has been nominated for five Gemini Awards, winning in 1988, and two Genie Awards. She has also received the ACTRA Toronto Award of Excellence.

Filmography

Film

Television

References

External links
 

1958 births
Living people
Best Actress in a Drama Series Canadian Screen Award winners
Canadian television actresses
Canadian people of Dutch descent
Actresses from Ontario
Toronto Metropolitan University alumni